Alena is a 1947 Czechoslovak comedy film, directed by Miroslav Cikán. It stars  Miluse Zoubková, Vladimír Repa, and Terezie Brzková.

References

External links
Alena at the Internet Movie Database

1947 films
Czechoslovak comedy films
1947 comedy films
Films directed by Miroslav Cikán
Czechoslovak black-and-white films
1940s Czech films